Michael Brown (born August 21, 1937) is a Canadian sprint canoer who competed in the early to mid-1960s. At the 1960 Summer Olympics in Rome, he was eliminated in the repechage round of the K-1 1000 m event. Four years later in Tokyo, Brown was eliminated in the semifinals of the K-2 1000 m.

References
Sports-reference.com profile

1937 births
Canadian male canoeists
Canoeists at the 1960 Summer Olympics
Canoeists at the 1964 Summer Olympics
Living people
Olympic canoeists of Canada